Port Byron is a village in Rock Island County, Illinois, United States and part of the Quad Cities Metropolitan Area. The population was 1,647 at the 2010 census.

Geography

Port Byron is located at  (41.618051, -90.332789).

Demographics

As of the census of 2010, there were 1,676 people, 623 households, and 419 families residing in the village. The racial makeup of the village was 98.83% White, 0.07% African American, 0.20% Native American, 0.07% Pacific Islander, 0.07% from other races, and 0.78% from two or more races. Hispanic or Latino of any race were 1.63% of the population.

There were 623 households, out of which 30.0% had children under the age of 18 living with them, 57.9% were married couples living together, 6.9% had a female householder with no husband present, and 32.6% were non-families. 28.6% of all households were made up of individuals, and 12.4% had someone living alone who was 65 years of age or older. The average household size was 2.46 and the average family size was 3.08.

In the village, the age distribution of the population shows 25.6% under the age of 18, 7.9% from 18 to 24, 27.4% from 25 to 44, 25.5% from 45 to 64, and 13.6% who were 65 years of age or older. The median age was 40 years. For every 100 females, there were 102.8 males. For every 100 females age 18 and over, there were 99.0 males.

The median income for a household in the village was $47,768, and the median income for a family was $59,000. Males had a median income of $44,926 versus $26,208 for females. The per capita income for the village was $24,363. About 2.1% of families and 4.0% of the population were below the poverty line, including 1.0% of those under age 18 and 8.8% of those age 65 or over.

Business

Tug Fest 
The event of the year in this small town is the Great River Tug Fest, held since 1987 on the second full weekend in August.  Following a fireworks display on Friday night, the Mississippi River is closed on Saturday afternoon.  The tug-of-war is made up of 10 men teams of 20 and one woman's team of 25. After a large rope is pulled across the river to Le Claire, Iowa, a tug of war takes place. The side with the most wins gets bragging rights for the year, along with the traveling alabaster trophy. Port Byron, the 2016 champion, holds an overall record of 21-11 in the competition. The rope used for the tug is 2700 feet in length and weighs about 700 lbs. Tug Fest is the only event in the United States that allows the Mississippi River to be closed down. The women on the Illinois side are the only undefeated team in Tug Fest history.

Will B. Rolling 
Will B. Rolling is the name of a 30' high statue of a rider perched atop his Penny-farthing. Erected on November 13, 2013 along the Great River Trail in Port Byron, the statue was a gift to the village from former mayor Lawrence Bay and his wife Carol. The "Will B. Rolling" statue was inspired by, and made from the same mold as, a statue named "Ben Bikin'" in Sparta, Wisconsin, and each year in October there is a bicycle-ride event from Port Byron to Sparta, called the "Will to Ben."

On April 25, 2014 River Action awarded Will B. Rolling the 2014 Eddy Award for Art.

Port Byron Online
The official city website is located on the internet at www.portbyronil.com.

Notable person

 Bill Malarkey, MLB pitcher for the New York Giants

References

External links

Village of Port Byron, Illinois website
Port Byron, Illinois Great River Tug Fest
Port Byron, Illinois Facebook page

Villages in Rock Island County, Illinois
Villages in Illinois
Cities in the Quad Cities
Populated places established in 1828
Illinois populated places on the Mississippi River